Olympique de Marseille Féminin (commonly referred to as  Olympique de Marseille, Marseille, or simply l'OM) is a French women's football club based in Marseille. The club has been the female section of Olympique de Marseille since 2011.

History
Olympique de Marseille was already active in women's football in the 1920s, making it one of the few active women's teams that took part in its original incarnation in pioneering the game in the interwars period. The team disappeared in the 1930s along with the other women's teams of the time, but it was reactivated when French women's football competitions returned in the 1970s and from 1975 it took part in the French championship, which later became the current national league. In 1979 it reached the championship's semifinals, but in 1983 it was relegated and three years later it disappeared.

In the 2011–12 season Olympique de Marseille created its women's team for the third time. It reached the second tier in the 2014–15 and in the 2016–17 it made its debut in the top tier with a 4th position.

Players

Current squad

See also
 Olympique de Marseille

References

External links
 Official Site

 
Women's football clubs in France
Olympique de Marseille
Division 1 Féminine clubs
Football clubs in Marseille
Association football clubs disestablished in 1986
1986 disestablishments in France
1927 establishments in France
Association football clubs established in 1927
2011 establishments in France
Association football clubs established in 2011